Beaconside is an area in Stafford, Staffordshire, England. The district is home to the Stafford branch of Staffordshire University along with the Ministry of Defence site MoD Stafford (which is a former RAF base). It is also the name of a major road in the area, part of the A513 road. For population details taken at the 2011 census see under Hopton and Coton civil parish.

Villages in Staffordshire
Stafford